Esfurin may refer to:
 Esfurin-e Olya
 Esfurin-e Sofla